The Statute Law Revision (Consequential Repeals) Act 1965 (c 55) was an Act of the Parliament of the United Kingdom.

This Act was repealed by section 86(2) of, and Schedule 11 to, the Social Security Act 1986.

Section 1 - Repeals and saving
Section 1(1) was repealed by section 1 of, and Part XI of the Schedule to, the Statute Law (Repeals) Act 1974.

Schedule
The Schedule was repealed by section 1 of, and Part XI of the Schedule to, the Statute Law (Repeals) Act 1974.

See also
Statute Law Revision Act

References
Halsbury's Statutes,
John Burke (General editor). Current Law Statutes Annotated 1965. Sweet & Maxwell, Stevens & Sons. London. W Green & Son. Edinburgh. 1965.
The Public General Acts and Church Assembly Measures 1965. HMSO. London. 1966. Volume II. Page 1193.
HC Deb vol 717, cols 639 to 640.

United Kingdom Acts of Parliament 1965